ITI Catholic University (German: Katholische Hochschule ITI) is a Catholic theological school in Austria. The school was founded in 1996 as the International Theological Institute at the request of Pope John Paul II. It was then located in the Kartause Gaming and moved in 2009 to Schloss Trumau near Vienna. Its motto is 'Sicut cervus ad fontes'. The ITI's patrons are St. Thérèse of the Child Jesus, St. Thomas Aquinas and St. Zdislava of Lemberk.

The ITI's mission, as established by Pope John Paul II, unites in a special manner the Eastern and Western traditions of the Church. The Mass/Divine Liturgy is celebrated daily in both the Roman and Byzantine Rites respectively. From its inception the ITI has also given special attention to marriage and family. The Institute employs the Great Books method in its pedagogy in preference to lecture-based instruction in the encyclopedist tradition. The ITI is committed to the primacy of Thomas Aquinas in Philosophy and Theology, it gives a special weighting to the Greek Fathers.

The student body tends to number around 70-90 students from all five continents.

On March 1 2021, the school's name was changed to "Katholische Hochschule ITI" in German, and "ITI Catholic University" in English.

Academics
The Institute's common language is English. Students taking canonical degrees are also instructed in or possess proficiency in Latin and Greek.

Degrees
In addition to the canonical degrees of STD, STL, and STM, the ITI offers a dedicated Masters programme in Marriage and the Family (MMF), and a one year, credit-only Studium Generale programme. In 2021, three new degree programs will be added: Master’s in Educational and Pedagogical Studies (MEP), Master’s in Law, Economics and Politics (MLEP) and Masters in Culture and Media Studies (MCM).

Presidents of the ITI
Dr. Michael Waldstein
Msgr. Dr. Larry Hogan
Dr. Christiaan Alting von Geusau

References

External links 
Official website

Seminaries and theological colleges in Austria
Catholic universities and colleges in Austria
Educational institutions established in 1996
1996 establishments in Austria